KRRB (88.1 FM) is a radio station licensed to Kuna, Idaho, United States. The station is an affiliate of Rejoice Broadcast Network, airing a Christian format, and is owned by Pensacola Christian College, Inc.

History
The station was granted a construction permit on October 27, 1997, and assigned the call letters KARJ by the Federal Communications Commission on September 30, 2002. On January 20, 2017, Educational Media Foundation sold the station's license to Pensacola Christian College, Inc. for $275,000, at which point the station changed its call sign to the current KRRB.

References

External links

Contemporary Christian radio stations in the United States
Radio stations established in 2005
2005 establishments in Idaho
RRB